Dynamine dyonis, the blue-eyed sailor, is a species of tropical brushfoot in the butterfly family Nymphalidae. It is found in North America.

The MONA or Hodges number for Dynamine dyonis is 4534.

References

Further reading

External links

 

Biblidinae
Articles created by Qbugbot
Butterflies described in 1837